Happy Christmas is the seventh studio album and second Christmas album by American recording artist Jessica Simpson, released on November 22, 2010 by Primary Wave. Produced by Kuk Harrell, Aaron Pearce, C. "Tricky" Stewart and The-Dream, it was her first album released by Primary Wave and features cover versions of various Christmas standards in addition to original material.

Background
Simpson parted ways with her record label, Epic Records, and signed a new record deal. She was interviewed by E! News and PopSugar.com where she revealed that she had been working on a new Christmas album. On September 15, 2010, it was announced that Simpson was working with the producers of The-Dream and Tricky Stewart in her next two albums. On October 12, 2010, Simpson announced via Twitter that she had completed recording this album. Simpson said that the concept of a new Christmas album came after PBS asked her if she would like to do a Christmas special. Simpson and PBS thought it would be a good idea to release an album along with a holiday special. The show premiered on television on December 4, 2010. The album was made available for streaming through Amazon.com. She also appeared on The Early Show, Late Night with Jimmy Fallon, Live with Regis and Kelly, Access Hollywood and performed at the Macy's Thanksgiving Day Parade and the Rockefeller Center Tree Lighting.

In an interview, Simpson said about that album: "This (album) is different because it's under my complete control, it's the first record that I'm putting out on eleveneleven Records which is my new record company. "I think it's great to have a spiritual record out there to be my first [on my new label] because that's how I got started in the business anyway".

Tricky Stewart told US Weekly about working with Simpson on the album: "I was so pleasantly surprised and happy with how everything came out! She is a gem just waiting to be rediscovered, so there is a definite possibility of us working together again in the future. She is fun and lighthearted but very serious about her singing. She is a little bit of an over-thinker sometimes because she puts so much pressure on herself. But, overall we had a great time making this record! We had to do it super fast — we started the negotiations and everything in October, which is really late for a Christmas album. But we got it done, it came out, and it's great — everyone loved it".

Promotion
Simpson appeared at The Early Show, the Late Show with David Letterman, Live with Regis and Kelly and at Macy's Thanksgiving Parade to promote the album.

Simpson and PBS announced that a Christmas musical special would air in the fall of 2010. The special, entitled Jessica Simpson: Happy Christmas was available to watch on November 25, 2010 on Simpson's official website and premiered on Saturday prime-time television on December 4, 2010. The show features Simpson singing a collection of Christmas hits from Happy Christmas and her first holiday album Rejoyce: The Christmas Album (2004). Simpson was also joined by special guests including her sister Ashlee Simpson, Trey Lorenz, Willie Nelson and Carly Simon. This was the second Christmas TV special featuring Simpson, the first being Nick and Jessica's Family Christmas with her ex-husband Nick Lachey.

Singles
"My Only Wish" was released as promotional single. It premiered at On Air with Ryan Seacrest and the Simpson website jessicasimpson.com, the November 11, 2010. The song was written by Aaron Pearce, Jessica Simpson and Christopher Stewart. "My Only Wish" is a love song, a good rhythm Christmas, featuring pop music and traditional rhythms, drum notes, and hard knocks and grooves. Background vocals are present throughout the chorus. The song received mixed reviews by music critics and was compared to "All I Want for Christmas Is You" (1994) by Mariah Carey. The song managed to reach the Top 50 most downloaded Christmas songs of iTunes in the United States. During the first week of release of the album, the song could be downloaded for free on iTunes Store. The single did not have a music video.

Critical reception

The album received positive reviews. Stephen Thomas Erlewine of Allmusic stated, "compared to 2004's brassy Rejoyce: The Christmas Album, Happy Christmas exists on a small stage: Simpson doesn't belt songs out, doesn't seem intent on wowing an audience with her pizzazz. [...]She may be intent on being all things to all people, but her eagerness to please suits the season and helps make Happy Christmas a better holiday soundtrack than Rejoyce."

Jon Caramanica from New York Times stated, "A Western-swing-influenced medley of "Here Comes Santa Claus" and "Santa Claus Is Coming to Town," sung by Jessica Simpson, and produced by Tricky Stewart and The-Dream? Someone's been paying attention to one critic's holiday wish list. Ms. Simpson, who began her career several lifetimes ago as a Christian singer, hasn't sounded as focused in years as she does on the feverishly pleasing "Happy Christmas," which is produced largely by Mr. Stewart and The-Dream, the synth-bliss R&B tastemakers, employing full restraint here. The bland bigness of holiday music suits Ms. Simpson's overpowering voice well, but even when she's testing it, she sounds sharp, whether on the multitracked delirium of "Carol of the Bells" or on an electric-blues version of "Merry Christmas Baby," where she energetically over-emotes against a more laconic holiday messenger, Willie Nelson"

Commercial performance
The album debuted at number 123 on US Billboard 200, becoming Simpson's lowest peak in the United States. It also debuted at number nine on US Billboard Independent Albums and number twenty three on Top Holiday Albums chart. In its second week the album dropped to number 185 with sales of over 5,000.

The album has sold 28,000 copies in the United States as of 2016.

Track listing

Notes
 signifies a vocal producer
 signifies a co-producer

Personnel 
Credits for Happy Christmas adapted from AllMusic.

 Chris Bellman – mastering
 John Britt – duet vocals
 Cacee Cobb – A&R
 Martin Cooke – assistant vocal engineer
 Steven Dennis – assistant engineer
 Michelle Gayhart – copyist
 Josh Grabelle – art direction, design, layout
 Josh Gudwin – vocal engineer
 Christy Hall – production coordination
 Kuk Harrell – producer, vocal engineer, vocal producer
 Travis Harrington – assistant engineer
 Wayne Haun – orchestration, string arrangements
 Tom Hemby – guitar
 Jeremy Hunter – string arrangements, string engineer
 Terius "The-Dream" Nash – executive producer, producer
 Willie Nelson – duet
 Ken Oriole – mixing assistant
 Aaron Pearce – arranger, producer, programming, string arrangements, background vocals
 Anibal Rojas – tenor saxophone
 Norman Jean Roy – cover photo
 Jason Sherwood – assistant engineer
 Christopher " C. Tricky" Stewart – executive producer, producer
 Brian "B-Luv" Thomas – engineer
 Michael Thompson – guitar
 Andrew Wuepper – engineer, mixing

Charts

Release history

References

2010 Christmas albums
Jessica Simpson albums
Eleveneleven albums
EMI Records albums
Christmas albums by American artists
Pop Christmas albums
Albums produced by Tricky Stewart
Albums produced by The-Dream
Albums produced by Kuk Harrell